Cry Along with the Babies is an EP by American rock band The Babies, released on January 10, 2012 by New Images Records. It features acoustic demos recorded in 2010 and early 2011 by Cassie Ramone and Kevin Morby in between tours and studio recording sessions. "On My Team" and "That Boy" were later included in their second album Our House on the Hill.

Track listing

Personnel
Kevin Morby – vocals, guitar
Cassie Ramone – vocals, guitar

References

External links

2012 EPs
The Babies albums